Biodiversity loss includes the worldwide extinction of different species, as well as the local reduction or loss of species in a certain habitat, resulting in a loss of biological diversity. The latter phenomenon can be temporary or permanent, depending on whether the environmental degradation that leads to the loss is reversible through ecological restoration/ecological resilience or effectively permanent (e.g. through land loss). The current global extinction (frequently called the sixth mass extinction or Anthropocene extinction), has resulted in a biodiversity crisis being driven by human activities which push beyond the planetary boundaries and so far has proven irreversible.

Even though permanent global species loss is a more dramatic and tragic phenomenon than regional changes in species composition, even minor changes from a healthy stable state can have dramatic influence on the food web and the food chain insofar as reductions in only one species can adversely affect the entire chain (coextinction), leading to an overall reduction in biodiversity, possible alternative stable states of an ecosystem notwithstanding. Ecological effects of biodiversity are usually counteracted by its loss. Reduced biodiversity in particular leads to reduced ecosystem services and eventually poses an immediate danger for food security, but also can have more lasting public health consequences for humans.

International environmental organizations have been campaigning to prevent biodiversity loss for decades, public health officials have integrated it into the One Health approach to public health practice, and increasingly preservation of biodiversity is part of international policy, as part of the response to the Triple planetary crisis. For example, the UN Convention on Biological Diversity is focused on preventing biodiversity loss and proactive conservation of wild areas. The international commitment and goals for this work is currently embodied by Sustainable Development Goal 15 "Life on Land" and Sustainable Development Goal 14 "Life Below Water". However, the United Nations Environment Programme report on "Making Peace with Nature" released in 2020 found that most of these efforts had failed to meet their international goals.

Loss rate

Biodiversity is commonly defined as the variety of life on Earth in all its forms, including the diversity of species, their genetic variations, and the interaction of these lifeforms.

The most unique feature of Earth is the existence of life, and the most extraordinary feature of life is its diversity. The current rate of global diversity loss is estimated to be 100 to 1000 times higher than the (naturally occurring) background extinction rate, faster than at any other time in human history, and expected to still grow in the upcoming years. These rapidly rising extinction trends impacting numerous animal groups including mammals, birds, reptiles, amphibians and ray-finned fishes have prompted scientists to declare a contemporary biodiversity crisis, in both terrestrial and marine ecosystems.

Locally bounded loss rates can be measured using species richness and its variation over time. Raw counts may not be as ecologically relevant as relative or absolute abundances. Taking into account the relative frequencies, many biodiversity indexes have been developed. Besides richness, evenness and heterogeneity are considered to be the main dimensions along which diversity can be measured.

As with all diversity measures, it is essential to accurately classify the spatial and temporal scope of the observation. "Definitions tend to become less precise as the complexity of the subject increases and the associated spatial and temporal scales widen." Biodiversity itself is not a single concept but can be split up into various scales (e.g. ecosystem diversity vs. habitat diversity or even biodiversity vs. habitat diversity) or different subcategories (e.g. phylogenetic diversity, species diversity, genetic diversity, nucleotide diversity). The question of net loss in confined regions is often a matter of debate but longer observation times are generally thought to be beneficial to loss estimates.

To compare rates between different geographic regions, latitudinal gradients in species diversity should also be considered.

In 2006, many more species were formally classified as rare or endangered or threatened; moreover, scientists have estimated that millions more species are at risk which have not been formally recognized.

In 2021, about 28 percent of the 134,400 species assessed using the IUCN Red List criteria are now listed as threatened with extinction—a total of 37,400 species compared to 16,119 threatened species in 2006.

A 2022 study published in Frontiers in Ecology and the Environment, which surveyed more than 3,000 experts, states that "global biodiversity loss and its impacts may be greater than previously thought," and estimates that roughly 30% of species "have been globally threatened or driven extinct since the year 1500."

Observations by type of life

Terrestrial invertebrate loss

In 2017, various publications described the dramatic reduction in absolute insect biomass and number of species in Germany and North America over a period of 27 years. As possible reasons for the decline, the authors highlight neonicotinoids and other agrochemicals. Writing in the journal PLOS One, Hallman et al. (2017) conclude that "the widespread insect biomass decline is alarming."

For example, the critical decline of earthworms (over 80% on average) has been recorded under non-ecological agricultural practices. Earthworms play an important role in ecosystem function. For example, they help with biological processing in soil, water, and even green house gas balancing. The decline of earthworm populations are said to be due to five reasons; soil degradation and destruction of habitat, climate change, biological invasion of nonnative species, poor soil management, and pollutant loading. Factors like tillage practices and intensive land use decimate the soil and plant roots that earthworms use to create their biomass, causing carbon and nitrogen cycles to be impacted negatively. Knowledge of earthworm species diversity is quite limited as not even 50% of them have been described. More studies upon earthworms and how they provide their ecosystem services must be done to gain a better understanding of going about preserving their diversity. With earthworm populations dwindling, this has caused for the Secretariat of the Convention on Biological Diversity to take action and promote the restoration and maintenance of the many diverse species of earthworms.

Birds loss 
Certain types of pesticide, neonicotinoids, probably contribute to the decline of certain bird species. A study funded by BirdLife International confirms that 51 species of birds are critically endangered and 8 could be classified as extinct or in danger of extinction.  Nearly 30% of extinction is due to hunting and trapping for the exotic pet trade.  Deforestation, caused by unsustainable logging and agriculture, could be the next extinction driver, because birds lose their habitat and their food. The biologist Luisa Arnedo said: "as soon as the habitat is gone, they're gone too".

Within the Amazon rainforest there is an area called Bele´m and it is an area of endemism. In Bele´m 76% of the land has already been stripped of its natural resources, including the trees of the forest. Within the area bird species are strongly affected by the deforestation, due to being put in that situation 56% of the birds are now in danger of going into extinction. With the climate changing as well as their habitat, the population of the birds will continue to decline. Even with protected areas of land, the efficiency in which birds are conserved are low.

Modern bird hunting and trapping is a common practice in South America. Some cultures in Brazil encourage bird hunting and trapping for commercial reasons. Some reasons include, selling the wild birds as pets, breeding the birds and selling the young, selling the birds for food, and selling them for religious and medicinal purposes.

Another increasingly abundant threat to bird populations is collisions and electrocutions due to power lines. Migratory species are at a higher risk of collision accidents and up to 1 billion birds are killed due to colliding with buildings each year in the United States.

Freshwater species loss
Freshwater ecosystems ranging from swamps, deltas, to rivers make up to 1% of earths surface. Although making up such little proportion of the earth, freshwater ecosystems are important because these kind of habitats are home to approximately one third of vertebrate species. Freshwater species are beginning to decline at twice the rate of other species such as those located on land or within the ocean, this rapid loss has already placed 27% of 29,500 species dependent on freshwater upon the IUCN Red List. With freshwater species declining so quickly, it is due to the poor systems in place that don't provide any protection to their biodiversity.

A study by 16 global conservation organizations found that the biodiversity crisis is most acute in freshwater ecosystems, with a rate of decline double that of oceans and forests. Global populations of freshwater fish are collapsing from anthropogenic impacts such as pollution and overfishing. Migratory fish populations have declined by 76% since 1970, and large "megafish" populations have fallen by 94% with 16 species declared extinct in 2020.

Native species richness loss
Humans have altered plant richness in regional landscapes worldwide, transforming more than 75% of the terrestrial biomes to "anthropogenic biomes." This is seen through loss of native species being replaced and out competed by agriculture. Models indicate that about half of the biosphere has seen a "substantial net anthropogenic change" in species richness.

Trees
Scientists have warned, in a follow-up paper to their 2021 study, that a third of tree species are threatened with extinction, showing how this will significantly alter the world's ecosystems and could get averted with "urgent actions". They find that "Large-scale extinction of tree species will lead to major biodiversity losses in other species groups and substantially alter the cycling of carbon, water and nutrients in the world's ecosystems" and may "undermine the livelihoods of [...] billions". The GTA (global tree assessment) has determined that there are 17510 or 29.9% are considered threatened with extinction and there are 142 tree species recorded as extinct or extinct in the wild.

Marine species richness loss 
Marine biodiversity encompasses any living organism which resides in the ocean, and describes various complex relationships within marine ecosystems. On a local and regional scale, marine communities are better understood compared to marine ecosystems on a global scale. In 2018, approximately 240,000 marine species had been documented, but many marine species - estimates range between 178,000 and 10 million oceanic species - remain to be described. Given the paucity of data on most marine species, it is likely that a number of 'rare' species not seen for decades in the world Ocean have already disappeared or are on the brink of extinction, unnoticed.

With anthropogenic pressure, this results in human activities having the strongest influences on marine biodiversity, with main drivers of global extinction being habitat loss, pollution, invasive species, and overexploitation. Greater pressure is placed on marine ecosystems with human settlements near coastal areas. Other indirect factors that have resulted in marine species to decline include climate change and change to oceanic biochemistry.

Overexploitation has resulted in the extinction of over 25 described marine species, which includes seabirds, marine mammals, algae, and fishes. Examples of extinct marine species include the Steller's sea cow (Hydrodamalis gigas) and the Caribbean monk seal (Monachus tropicalis). However, not all extinctions are because of humans. For example, in 1930, the eelgrass limpet (Lottia alveus) became extinct once the Zostera marina seagrass population declined upon exposure to a disease. The Lottia alveus were greatly impacted as the Zostera marina were their sole habitats.

Causes 

Major factors for biotic stress and the ensuing accelerating loss rate are, amongst other threats:
 Habitat loss, fragmentation and degradation
 Land use intensification (and ensuing land loss/habitat loss) has been identified to be a significant factor in loss of ecological services due to direct effects as well as biodiversity loss. Habitat fragmentation for commercial and agricultural uses (specifically monoculture farming) is another factor.
 Excessive nutrient load and other forms of pollution
 Over-exploitation and unsustainable use (e.g. unsustainable fishing methods) 
 Armed conflict, which disrupts human livelihoods and institutions, contributes to habitat loss, and intensifies over-exploitation of economically valuable species, leading to population declines and local extinctions.
 Invasive alien species that effectively compete for a niche, replacing indigenous species
 Climate change through heat stress and drought stress
Invasive species and other disturbances have become more common in forests in the last several decades. These tend to be directly or indirectly connected to climate change and have negative consequences for forest ecosystems.

Jared Diamond describes an "Evil Quartet" of habitat destruction, overkill, introduced species and secondary extinctions. Edward O. Wilson prefers the acronym HIPPO, standing for Habitat destruction, Invasive species, Pollution, human over-Population and Over-harvesting.

According to the IUCN the main direct threats to conservation fall in 11 categories

1.  Residential & commercial development

 housing & urban areas (urban areas, suburbs, villages, vacation homes, shopping areas, offices, schools, hospitals)
 commercial & industrial areas (manufacturing plants, shopping centers, office parks, military bases, power plants, train & shipyards, airports)
 tourism & recreational areas (skiing, golf courses, sports fields, parks, campgrounds)

2.  Farming activities

 agriculture (crop farms, orchards, vineyards, plantations, ranches)
 aquaculture (shrimp or finfish aquaculture, fish ponds on farms, hatchery salmon, seeded shellfish beds, artificial algal beds)

3. Energy production & mining

 renewable energy production (geothermal, solar, wind, & tidal farms), including hydroelectric dams
 non-renewable energy production (oil and gas drilling)
 mining (fuel and minerals)

4.  Transportation & service corridors

 service corridors (electrical & phone wires, aqueducts, oil & gas pipelines)
 transport corridors (roads, railroads, shipping lanes, and flight paths)
 collisions with the vehicles using the corridors
 associated accidents and catastrophes (oil spills, electrocution, fire)

5.  Biological resource usages

 hunting (bushmeat, trophy, fur)
 persecution (predator control and pest control, superstitions)
 plant destruction or removal (human consumption, free-range livestock foraging, battling timber disease, orchid collection)
 logging or wood harvesting (selective or clear-cutting, firewood collection, charcoal production)
 fishing (trawling, whaling, live coral or seaweed or egg collection)

6.  Human intrusions & activities that alter, destroy, disturb habitats and species from exhibiting natural behaviors

 recreational activities (off-road vehicles, motorboats, jet-skis, snowmobiles, ultralight planes, dive boats, whale watching, mountain bikes, hikers, birdwatchers, skiers, pets in recreational areas, temporary campsites, caving, rock-climbing)
 war, civil unrest, & military exercises (armed conflict, minefields, tanks & other military vehicles, training exercises & ranges, defoliation, munitions testing)
 illegal activities (smuggling, vandalism)
 newly built housing

7.  Natural system modifications

 fire suppression or creation (controlled burns, inappropriate fire management, escaped agricultural and campfires, arson)
 water management (dam construction & operation, wetland filling, surface water diversion, groundwater pumping)
 other modifications (land reclamation projects, shoreline rip-rap, lawn cultivation, beach construction and maintenance, tree-thinning in parks)
 removing/reducing human maintenance (mowing meadows, reduction in controlled burns, lack of indigenous management of key ecosystems, ceasing supplemental feeding of condors)

8.  Invasive & problematic species, pathogens & genes

 invasive species (feral horses & household pets, zebra mussels, Miconia tree, kudzu, introduction for biocontrol)
 problematic native species (overabundant native deer or kangaroo, overabundant algae due to loss of native grazing fish, locust-type plagues)
 introduced genetic material (pesticide-resistant crops, genetically modified insects for biocontrol, genetically modified trees or salmon, escaped hatchery salmon, restoration projects using non-local seed stock)
 pathogens & microbes (plague affecting rodents or rabbits, Dutch elm disease or chestnut blight, Chytrid fungus affecting amphibians outside of Africa)

9. Pollution

 sewage (untreated sewage, discharges from poorly functioning sewage treatment plants, septic tanks, pit latrines, oil or sediment from roads, fertilizers and pesticides from lawns and golf courses, road salt)
 industrial & military effluents (toxic chemicals from factories, illegal dumping of chemicals, mine tailings, arsenic from gold mining, leakage from fuel tanks, PCBs in river sediments)
 agricultural & forestry effluents (nutrient loading from fertilizer run-off, herbicide run-off, manure from feedlots, nutrients from aquaculture, soil erosion)
 garbage & solid waste (municipal waste, litter & dumped possessions, flotsam & jetsam from recreational boats, waste that entangles wildlife, construction debris)
 air-borne pollutants (acid rain, smog from vehicle emissions, excess nitrogen deposition, radioactive fallout, wind dispersion of pollutants or sediments from farm fields, smoke from forest fires or wood stoves)
 excess energy (noise from highways or airplanes, sonar from submarines that disturbs whales, heated water from power plants, lamps attracting insects, beach lights disorienting turtles, atmospheric radiation from ozone holes)

10. Catastrophic geological events

 earthquakes, tsunamis, avalanches, landslides, & volcanic eruptions and gas emissions

11. Climate changes

 ecosystem encroachment (inundation of shoreline ecosystems & drowning of coral reefs from sea level rise, dune encroachment from desertification, woody encroachment into grasslands)
 changes in geochemical regimes (ocean acidification, changes in atmospheric CO2 affecting plant growth, loss of sediment leading to broad-scale subsidence)
 changes in temperature regimes (heat waves, cold spells, oceanic temperature changes, melting of glaciers/sea ice)
 changes in precipitation & hydrological regimes (droughts, rain timing, loss of snow cover, increased severity of floods)
 severe weather events (thunderstorms, tropical storms, hurricanes, cyclones, tornadoes, hailstorms, ice storms or blizzards, dust storms, erosion of beaches during storms)
 drought can lead to changes in functional composition.

Habitat destruction 

Habitat destruction has played a key role in extinctions, especially in relation to tropical forest destruction. Factors contributing to habitat loss include: overconsumption, overpopulation, land use change, deforestation, pollution (air pollution, water pollution, soil contamination) and global warming or climate change.

Habitat size and numbers of species are systematically related. Physically larger species and those living at lower latitudes or in forests or oceans are more sensitive to reduction in habitat area. Conversion to "trivial" standardized ecosystems (e.g., monoculture following deforestation) effectively destroys habitat for the more diverse species that preceded the conversion. Even the simplest forms of agriculture affect diversity – through clearing/draining the land, discouraging weeds and "pests", and encouraging just a limited set of domesticated plant and animal species. In some countries, property rights or lax law/regulatory enforcement are associated with deforestation and habitat loss.

A 2007 study conducted by the National Science Foundation found that biodiversity and genetic diversity are codependent—that diversity among species requires diversity within a species and vice versa. "If anyone type is removed from the system, the cycle can break down and the community becomes dominated by a single species." , the most threatened ecosystems occur in fresh water, according to the Millennium Ecosystem Assessment 2005, which was confirmed by the "Freshwater Animal Diversity Assessment" organised by the biodiversity platform and the French Institut de recherche pour le développement (MNHNP).

Co-extinctions are a form of habitat destruction. Co-extinction occurs when the extinction or decline in one species accompanies similar processes in another, such as in plants and beetles.

A 2019 report has revealed that bees and other pollinating insects have been wiped out of almost a quarter of their habitats across the United Kingdom. The population crashes have been happening since the 1980s and are affecting biodiversity. The increase in industrial farming and pesticide use, combined with diseases, invasive species, and climate change is threatening the future of these insects and the agriculture they support.

In 2019, research was published showing that insects are destroyed by human activities like habitat destruction, pesticide poisoning, invasive species and climate change at a rate that will cause the collapse of ecological systems in the next 50 years if it cannot be stopped.

Human overpopulation and overconsumption 
The world's population numbered nearly 7.6 billion as of mid-2017 and is forecast to reach 11.1 billion in 2100. Sir David King, former chief scientific adviser to the UK government, told a parliamentary inquiry: "It is self-evident that the massive growth in the human population through the 20th century has had more impact on biodiversity than any other single factor."

Scholars have argued that population size and growth, along with overconsumption, are significant factors in biodiversity loss and soil degradation, Review articles, including the 2019 IPBES report, have also noted that human population growth and overconsumption are significant drivers of species decline. A 2022 study warned that conservation efforts will continue to fail if the primary drivers of biodiversity loss continue to be ignored, including population size and growth. In December 2022 Inger Andersen, the executive director of the United Nations Environment Programme, stated as delegates were meeting for COP 15 that "the more people there are, the more we put the Earth under heavy pressure. As far as biodiversity is concerned, we are at war with nature."

A 2022 perspective paper argued for the need to reduce fertility rates among "the overconsuming wealthy and middle classes," and wasteful consumption in general, with the ultimate goal being to reduce "the scale of the human enterprise" in order to mitigate the contemporary extinction crisis.

However, other scientists have criticized the assertation that population growth is a key driver for biodiversity loss.  A scientific perspective, published in the journal Biological Conservation argues the main driver is the loss of habitat is caused by "the growth of commodities for export, particularly soybean and oil-palm, primarily for livestock feed or biofuel consumption in higher income economies."

Human drivers of biodiversity loss include habitat alteration, pollution, and overexploitation of resources. Habitat destruction, which can come in many forms is the global leader in loss of biodiversity

Change in land use

Examples of changes in land use include deforestation, intensive monoculture, and urbanization.

The 2019 IPBES Global Assessment Report on Biodiversity and Ecosystem Services asserts that industrial agriculture is the primary driver collapsing biodiversity. The UN's Global Biodiversity Outlook 2014 estimates that 70 percent of the projected loss of terrestrial biodiversity are caused by agriculture use. Moreover, more than 1/3 of the planet's land surface is utilised for crops and grazing of livestock. Agriculture destroys biodiversity by converting natural habitats to intensely managed systems and by releasing pollutants, including greenhouse gases. Food value chains further amplify impacts including through energy use, transport and waste. According to a 2020 study published in Nature Sustainability, more than 17,000 species are at risk of losing habitat by 2050 as agriculture continues to expand to meet future food needs. The researchers suggest that greater agricultural efficiency in the developing world and large scale transitions to healthier, Plant-based diets could help reduce habitat loss. Similarly, a Chatham House report also posited that a global shift towards largely plant-based diets would free up land to allow for the restoration of ecosystems and biodiversity, because in the 2010s over 80% of all global farmland was used to rear animals. A 2022 report published in Science concluded that at least 64 million square kilometers (24.7 million square miles)—44% of terrestrial area—require conservation attention (ranging from protected areas to land-use policies) in order to secure important biodiversity areas, ecologically intact areas, and optimal locations for representation of species ranges and ecoregions.

The direct effects of urban growth on habitat loss are well understood: building construction often results in habitat destruction and fragmentation. The rise of urbanization greatly reduced biodiversity when large areas of natural habitat are fragmented, leading to selection for species that are adapted to urban environments. Small habitat patches are unable to support the same level of genetic or taxonomic diversity as they formerly could while some of the more sensitive species may become locally extinct. Species abundance populations are reduced due to the reduced fragmented area of habitat, this causes an increase of species isolation and forces species towards edge habitats and adapt to foraging elsewhere. Human caused habitat fragmentation tends to create barriers to dispersal which prevent species from moving with its ideal environment as its shifted by climate change. While the negative effects of fragmentation tend to be well known, the risk of fragmentation tends to have smaller effects on biodiversity, and can even change and strengthen certain inter-species relationships.

Pollution

Air pollution 

Air pollution adversely affects biodiversity  and is considered the world's largest environmental threat. Four greenhouse gases that are commonly studied and monitored are water vapor, carbon dioxide, methane, and nitrous oxide. In the past 250 years, concentrations of carbon dioxide and methane have increased, along with the introduction of purely anthropogenic emissions such as hydrofluorocarbons, perfluorocarbons, and sulfur hexafluoride into the atmosphere. These pollutants are emitted into the atmosphere by the burning of fossil fuels and biomass, deforestation, and agricultural practices which amplify the effects of climate change. As larger concentrations of greenhouse gases are released into the atmosphere, this causes the Earth's surface temperature to increase. This is because greenhouse gases are capable of absorbing, emitting, and trapping heat from the Sun and into the Earth's atmosphere. With the increase in temperature expected from increasing greenhouse gases, there will be higher levels of air pollution, greater variability in weather patterns, intensification of climate change effects, and changes in the distribution of vegetation in the landscape.

Other pollutants that are released from industrial and agricultural activity are sulfur dioxide and nitrogen oxides. Once sulfur dioxide and nitrogen oxide are introduced into the atmosphere, they can react with cloud droplets (cloud condensation nuclei), raindrops, or snowflakes, forming sulfuric acid and nitric acid. With the interaction between water droplets and sulfuric and nitric acids, wet deposition occurs and creates acid rain. As a result, these acids would be displaced into various environments and vegetation during precipitation, having significant aerial distance (hundreds of kilometres) from the emission source. Sulfur dioxide and nitrogen oxide can also be displaced onto vegetations through dry deposition.

Sulfur dioxide and nitrous oxide concentration has many implication on aquatic ecosystems, including acidity change, increased nitrogen and aluminum content, and altering biogeochemical processes. Typically, sulfur dioxide and nitrous oxide do not have direct physiological effects upon exposure; most effects are developed by accumulation and prolonged exposure of these gases in the environment, modifying soil and water chemistry. Consequently, sulfur largely contributes to lake and ocean acidification, and nitrogen initiates eutrophication of inland and coastal water bodies that lack nitrogen. Both of these phenomena alter the native aquatic biota composition and influence the original food web with higher acidity level, minimizing aquatic and marine biodiversity.

Nitrogen deposition has also affected terrestrial ecosystems, including forests, grasslands, alpine regions, and bogs. The influx of nitrogen has altered the natural biogeochemical cycle and promoted soil acidification. As a result, it is likely that plant and animal species composition and ecosystem functionality will decline with increased soil sensitivity; contribute to slower forest growth, tree damage at higher elevations, and replacement of native biota with nitrogen-loving species. Additionally, sulfate and nitrate can be leached from the soil, removing essential nutrients such as calcium and magnesium, and be deposited into freshwater, coastal, and oceanic environments, promoting eutrophication.

Noise pollution 

Noise generated by traffic, ships, vehicles, and aircraft can affect the survivability of wildlife species and can reach undisturbed habitats. Although sounds are commonly present in the environment, anthropogenic noises are distinguishable due to differences in frequency and amplitude. Many animals use sounds to communicate with others of their species, whether that is for reproduction purposes, navigation, or to notify others of prey or predators. However, anthropogenic noises inhibit species from detecting these sounds, affecting overall communication within the population. Species such as birds, amphibians, reptiles, fishes, mammals, and invertebrates are examples of biological groups that are impacted by noise pollution. If animals cannot communicate with one another, this would result in reproduction to decline (not able to find mates), and higher mortality (lack of communication for predator detection).

Noise pollution is common in marine ecosystems, affecting at least 55 marine species. For many marine populations, sound is their primary sense used for their survival; able to detect sound hundreds to thousands kilometers away from a source, while vision is limited to tens of meters underwater. As anthropogenic noises continue to increase, doubling every decade, this compromises the survivability of marine species. One study discovered that as seismic noises and naval sonar increases in marine ecosystems, cetacean, such as whales and dolphins, diversity decreases. Noise pollution has also impaired fish hearing, killed and isolated whale populations, intensified stress response in marine species, and changed species' physiology. Because marine species are sensitive to noise, most marine wildlife are located in undisturbed habitats or areas not exposed to significant anthropogenic noise, limiting suitable habitats to forage and mate. Whales have changed their migration route to avoid anthropogenic noise, as well as altering their calls. Noise pollution also impacts human livelihood. Multiple studies have noticed that fewer fishes, such as cod, haddock, rockfish, herring, sand seal, and blue whiting, have been spotted in areas with seismic noises, with catch rates declining by 40–80%.

Noise pollution has also altered avian communities and diversity. Anthropogenic noises have a similar effect on bird population as seen in marine ecosystems, where noises reduce reproductive success; cannot detect predators due to interferences of anthropogenic noises, minimize nesting areas, increase stress response, and species abundances and richness declining. Certain avian species are more sensitive to noises compared to others, resulting in highly-sensitive birds migrating to less disturbed habitats. There has also been evidence of indirect positive effects of anthropogenic noises on avian populations. In a study conducted by Francis and his colleagues, nesting bird predators, such as the western scrub-jay (Aphelocoma californica), were uncommon in noisy environments (western scrub-jay are sensitive to noise). Therefore, reproductive success for nesting prey communities was higher due to the lack of predators. Noise pollution can alter the distribution and abundance of prey species, which can then impact predator populations.

Pollution from fossil fuel extraction 
At fossil fuel extraction sites, land conversion, habitat loss and degradation, contamination, and pollution impacts biodiversity beyond terrestrial ecosystems; it impacts freshwater, coastal, and marine environments. Once fossil fuels have been extracted, they are transported, processed, and refined, which also impacts biodiversity as infrastructure development requires removal of habitats, and further pollution is emitted into the environment.

Fossil fuel exploitation tends to occur in areas with high species richness and abundances, usually located in coastal and terrestrial environments. Therefore, biodiversity could be lost with fossil fuel exploitation. For example, the Western Amazon (located in Brazil) is known to have high biodiversity. However, this region is also threatened by exploitation due to the large quantity of oil and natural gas reservoirs. Typically, areas with large fossil fuel reservoirs have a greater likelihood of being extracted (based on the country's priorities). This is of concern as tropical environments contain high levels of biodiversity, which will indirectly result in greater deforestation for agricultural purposes and financial gains (e.g., exporting timber).

Invasive species 

Invasive species have major implications on biodiversity loss and have degraded various ecosystems worldwide. Invasive species are migrant species that have outcompeted and displaced native species, altered species richness and food webs, and changed ecosystems' functions and services. According to the Millennium Ecosystem Assessment, invasive species are considered one of the top five factors which result in biodiversity loss. In the past half century, biological invasions have increased immensely worldwide due to economic globalization, resulting in biodiversity loss. Ecosystems that are vulnerable to biological invasions include coastal areas, freshwater ecosystems, islands, and places with a Mediterranean climate. One study conducted a meta-analysis on the impacts of invasive species on Mediterranean-type ecosystems, and observed a significant loss in native species richness.

Invasive species are introduced to new habitat, either intentionally or unintentionally, by human activities. The most common methods for the introduction of aquatic invasive species are by ballast water, on the hulls of ships, and attached to equipment such as fishing nets. Some invasive species may be better able to tolerate and adapt to changing climate conditions, giving them a competitive advantage over native species.

Climate change has changed typical conditions in various environments, allowing greater migration and distribution of species dependent on warm climate. This phenomenon could either result in greater biodiversity (new species being introduced to new environments), or reduce biodiversity (promotion of invasive species). A biological invasion is deemed successful if the invasive species can adapt and survive in the new environment, reproduce, disperse, and compete with native communities. Some invasive species are known to have high dispersal rates and have major implications on a regional scale. For example, in 2010, muskrat, raccoon dog, thrips, and Chinese mitten crab were identified to have affected 20 to 50 regions in Europe.

Overexploitation 

Overexploitation occurs when a resource is consumed at an unsustainable rate. This occurs on land in the form of overhunting, excessive logging, poor soil conservation in agriculture and the illegal wildlife trade. Overexploitation can lead to resource destruction, including extinction.  Artificially developed projects can cause damage to the surrounding environment

The overkill hypothesis, a pattern of large animal extinctions connected with human migration patterns, can be used to explain why megafaunal extinctions can occur within a relatively short time period.

Overfishing 

Human demands and consumption have resulted in overfishing, which leads to a loss in biodiversity with reduction of fish species richness and of population abundances, and to depletion of large predatory fishes at the top of marine food webs.

About 25% of world fisheries are now overfished to the point where their current biomass is less than the level that maximizes their sustainable yield.

Reduction in global fish populations were first noticed during the 1990s. Currently, many commercial fishes have been overharvested: a 2020 report by FAO classified as overfished 34 percent of the fish stocks of the world’s marine fisheries. By the same period, global fish populations were reduced by 38% compared to 1970. Regional examples abound: in the United States approximately 27% of exploited fish stocks are considered overfished. In Tasmania, over 50% of major fisheries species, such as the eastern gemfish, the southern rock lobster, southern bulkefin tuna, jack mackerel, or trumpeter, have declined over the past 75 years due to overfishing. The depletion of large predatory fishes at the top of marine food webs due to overfishing can have cascading effects on entire ecosystems. the loss of large predatory fish species can result in an increase in smaller predator populations, which in turn can lead to a decrease in herbivore populations, ultimately leading to a loss of kelp forests and other important habitats. Fishery methods, such as bottom trawling and longline fishing have caused habitat destruction, resulting spatial diversity and regional species richness to decline. What these methods cause is an issue of bycatch. The problem with bycatch is that there is a lack of reportage done from what species have been caught, a lot of the time an unwanted target is caught they are reported as "mixed fish" or are not reported. Unwanted species caught within bycatch tend to be released,but it's common that captured fish die while in captivity, or die after being released. With an overexploitation of species being removed from their ecosystem, the trophic level becomes interrupted which in turn disrupts the food web.Some studies, including the 2019 Intergovernmental Science-Policy Platform on Biodiversity and Ecosystem Services report, found that overfishing is the main driver of mass species extinction in the oceans. Overfishing has reduced fish and marine mammal biomass by 60% since the 1800s, and is currently driving over one-third of sharks and rays to extinction.

Climate change 

Some contemporary studies have suggested that addressing climate change alone will not resolve the biodiversity crisis.

Extinction risks

Effect on plants 

In addition, Pre-species barriers for plants are also the indirect effects of climate change due to human activities. First, as mentioned above, the reduction in the number of birds and insects used to help pollinate plants will reduce the chance of mating between plants. Second, extended fire weather seasons may result in more severe burn conditions and shorter burn intervals, which can threaten the biodiversity of native vegetation. Besides, species habitat changes or migrations under changing weather conditions can cause non-native plants and pest to cause damage to native vegetation diversity, making them less structurally functional and more vulnerable to external damage, which would all eventually lead to biodiversity loss.

Plant and animal populations are interconnected. There are a number of examples in nature that display this dependency. Consider pollinator reliant plant species that display an observable sensitivity to pollinator activity. A 2007 study looked into the relationship between plant diversity and phenology, experimentally determining that plant diversity influenced the broader community flowering time. Flowering time is important piece in the pollination puzzle as it impacts the food supply for pollinators. This in turn can play a major role in agricultural pursuits  and global food security.

While plants are essential for human survival, they have not received the same attention as the subject of conservation efforts as animals. It's estimated that a third of all land plant species are at risk of extinction and 94% have yet to be evaluated in terms of their conservation status. Plants existing at the lowest trophic level shows a need for an active effort for plant conservation as this will cause all higher levels to reduce in biodiversity in tandem with the reduction of plant biodiversity.

Effects on aquatic macroinvertebrates and microbes 
Many scientists have studied the effects of climate change on the community structures and behaviors of aquatic macroinvertebrates and microbes – which are the prominent foundation of nutrient cycling in aquatic systems. These organisms are responsible for breaking down organic matter into essential carbon and nutrients that get cycled throughout the system and maintain health and production of the entire habitat. However, there have been numerous studies (through experimental warming) that have shown increases in microbial respiration of carbon out of the system, with a simultaneous decrease in leaf litter breakdown caused by temperature-sensitive macroinvertebrates. As temperatures are expected to increase largely due to anthropogenic influence, the abundance, type, and efficiency of macroinvertebrate and microbial organisms in aquatic systems will likely be dramatically altered.

Impacts

Ecological effects of biodiversity loss

Biodiversity loss also threatens the structure and proper functioning of the ecosystem. Although all ecosystems are able to adapt to the stresses associated with reductions in biodiversity to some degree, biodiversity loss reduces an ecosystem's complexity, as roles once played by multiple interacting species or multiple interacting individuals are played by fewer or none. The effects of species loss or changes in composition, and the mechanisms by which the effects manifest themselves, can differ among ecosystem properties, ecosystem types, and pathways of potential community change. At higher levels of extinction (40 to 60 percent of species), the effects of species loss ranked with those of many other major drivers of environmental change, such as ozone pollution, acid deposition on forests and nutrient pollution. Finally, the effects are also seen on human needs such as clean water, air and food production over-time. For example, studies over the last two decades have demonstrated that more biologically diverse ecosystems are more productive. As a result, there has been growing concern that the very high rates of modern extinctions – due to habitat loss, overharvesting and other human-caused environmental changes – could reduce nature's ability to provide goods and services like food, clean water and a stable climate.

An October 2020 analysis by Swiss Re found that one-fifth of all countries are at risk of ecosystem collapse as the result of anthropogenic habitat destruction and increased wildlife loss. If these losses are not reversed, as a 2023 study published in Current Biology suggests, it could inevitably trigger a total ecosystem collapse.

Impact on food and agriculture

In 2019, the UN's Food and Agriculture Organization produced its first report on The State of the World's Biodiversity for Food and Agriculture, which warned that "Many key components of biodiversity for food and agriculture at genetic, species and ecosystem levels are in decline." The report states that this is being caused by "a variety of drivers operating at a range of levels" and more specifically that "major global trends such as changes in climate, international markets and demography give rise to more immediate drivers such as land-use change, pollution and overuse of external inputs, overharvesting and the proliferation of invasive species. Interactions between drivers often exacerbate their effects on biodiversity for food and agriculture (BFA). Demographic changes, urbanization, markets, trade and consumer preferences are reported [by the countries that provided inputs to the report] to have a strong influence on food systems, frequently with negative consequences for BFA and the ecosystem services it provides. However, such drivers are also reported to open opportunities to make food systems more sustainable, for example through the development of markets for biodiversity-friendly products." It further states that "the driver mentioned by the highest number of countries as having negative effects on regulating and supporting ecosystem services [in food and agricultural production systems] is changes in land and water use and management" and that  "loss and degradation of forest and aquatic ecosystems and, in many production systems, transition to intensive production of a reduced number of species, breeds and varieties, remain major drivers of loss of BFA and ecosystem services."

The health of humans is largely dependent on the product of an ecosystem. With biodiversity loss, a huge impact on human health comes as well. Biodiversity makes it possible for humans to have a sustainable level of soils and the means to have the genetic factors to have food.

Many activists and scholars have suggested that there is a connection between plant patent protection and the loss of crop biodiversity, although such claims are contested.

Human health 
The decrease in biodiversity has several implications for human health. One such implication is the loss of medicinal plants. The use of plants for medicinal purposes is extensive, with ~70 to 80% of individuals worldwide relying solely on plant-based medicine as their primary source of healthcare. This dependency on plants for medicinal purposes is especially rife in developing countries. Local knowledge surrounding medicinal plants is useful for screening for new herbal medicines that may be useful for treating disease. Villages and communities which reside continually in a single geographic area over time, create, transmit and apply widespread information surrounding the medicinal resources in the area. Formal scientific methods have been useful in identifying the active ingredients used in ethnopharmacy and applying them to modern medicines.  However, it is important that medicinal resources are managed appropriately as they become globally traded in order to prevent species endangerment. Changes to local ecosystems (such as access to food and clean water) can indirectly impact the local economy, and society (livihood and social interaction between people living in the impacted area). Therefore impacting the health of the people.

The October 2020 "Era of Pandemics" report by IPBES asserted that the same human activities which are the underlying drivers of climate change and biodiversity loss are also the same drivers of pandemics, including the COVID-19 pandemic.

Proposed solutions and economics 
There are many conservation challenges when dealing with biodiversity loss that a joint effort needs to be made through public policies, economic solutions, monitoring and education by governments, NGOs, conservationists etc. Incentives are required to protect species and conserve their natural habitat and disincentivize habitat loss and degradation (e.g. implementing sustainable development including targets of SDG 15). Other ways to achieve this goal are enforcing laws that prevent poaching wildlife, protect species from overhunting and overfishing and keep the ecosystems they rely on intact and secure from species invasions and land use conversion. Furthermore, conservation based models like the Global Safety Net are continuously being developed to consider the ecological connections that need to be addressed to effectively mitigate biodiversity loss. According to the Intergovernmental Science-Policy Platform on Biodiversity and Ecosystem Services (IPBES) action to protect biodiversity is very cost effective because it reduces the risk of pandemics due to pathogens from wildlife.

Conservationists and sustainable research scientists around the world have also developed systems-based approaches to help mitigate biodiversity loss. This methodology allows scientists to create contextual frameworks that consider the many nuances and linkages of environmental conservation like ecological footprints, planetary boundaries, ecological economics, etc. Considering all the many ways in which the natural and human world intersect can help researchers understand the intricacies that lead to biodiversity loss and find patterns that can be applied to similar situations. One example of these type of frameworks is the triple bottom line, which has been adopted by many businesses and organizations to evaluate their impact and progress towards the marriage of social, environmental, and economic success.

In society 

In September 2020 scientists reported that "immediate efforts, consistent with the broader sustainability agenda but of unprecedented ambition and coordination, could enable the provision of food for the growing human population while reversing the global terrestrial biodiversity trends caused by habitat conversion" and recommend measures such as for addressing drivers of land-use change, and for increasing the extent of land under conservation management, efficiency in agriculture and the shares of plant-based diets.

International action 

There are many organizations devoted to the cause of prioritizing conservation efforts such as the Red List of Threatened Species from the International Union for Conservation of Nature and Natural Resources (IUCN) and the United States Endangered Species Act. British environmental scientist Norman Myers and his colleagues have identified 25 terrestrial biodiversity hotspots that could serve as priorities for habitat protection.

Many governments in the world have conserved portions of their territories under the Convention on Biological Diversity (CBD), a multilateral treaty signed in 1992–3.  The 20 Aichi Biodiversity Targets, part of the CBD's Strategic Plan 2011–2020, were published in 2010. Since 2010, approximately 164 countries have developed plans to reach their conservation targets, including the protection of 17 percent of terrestrial and inland waters and 10 percent of coastal and marine areas.

In 2019 the Intergovernmental Science-Policy Platform on Biodiversity and Ecosystem Services (IPBES), an international organization formed to serve a similar role to the Intergovernmental Panel on Climate Change (IPCC), published the Global Assessment Report on Biodiversity and Ecosystem Services which said that up to a million plant and animal species are facing extinction because of human activities. An October 2020 report by IPBES stated that the same human activities which are the underlying drivers of climate change and biodiversity loss, such as the destruction of wildlife and wild habitats, are also the same drivers of pandemics, including the COVID-19 pandemic. In 2022, IPBES listed some of the primary drivers of the contemporary extinction crisis as being unsustainable fishing, hunting and logging.

According to the 2020 United Nations' Global Biodiversity Outlook report, of the 20 biodiversity goals laid out by the Aichi Biodiversity Targets in 2010, only 6 were "partially achieved" by the deadline of 2020. The report highlighted that if the status quo is not changed, biodiversity will continue to decline due to "currently unsustainable patterns of production and consumption, population growth and technological developments". The report also singled out Australia, Brazil and Cameroon and the Galapagos Islands (Ecuador) for having had one of its animals lost to extinction in the past 10 years. Following this, the leaders of 64 nations and the European Union pledged to halt environmental degradation and restore the natural world. Leaders from some of the world's biggest polluters, namely China, India, Russia, Brazil and the United States, were not among them. Some experts contend that the refusal of the United States to ratify the Convention on Biological Diversity is harming global efforts to halt the extinction crisis. Top scientists say that even if the 2010 targets had been met, it likely would not have resulted in any substantive reductions of current extinction rates. Others have raised concerns that the Convention on Biological Diversity does not go far enough, and argue the goal should be zero extinctions by 2050, along with cutting the impact of unsustainable food production on nature by half. That the targets are not legally binding has also been subject to criticism.

In 2020, with passing of the 2020 target date for the Aichi Biodiversity Targets, scientists proposed a measurable, near-term biodiversity target – comparable to the below 2 °C global warming target – of keeping described species extinctions to well below 20 per year over the next 100 years across all major groups (fungi, plants, invertebrates, and vertebrates) and across all ecosystem types (marine, freshwater, and terrestrial).

A 2021 collaborative report by scientists from the IPBES and the IPCC says that biodiversity loss and climate change must be addressed simultaneously, as they are inexorably linked and have similar effects on human well-being. Pamela McElwee, human ecologist and co-author of the report, says "climate has simply gotten more attention because people are increasingly feeling it in their own lives – whether it's wildfires or hurricane risk. Our report points out that biodiversity loss has that similar effect on human wellbeing."

On December 19, every country on earth, with the exception of the United States and the Holy See, signed onto the agreement which includes protecting 30% of land and oceans by 2030 (30 by 30) and 22 other targets intended to reduce biodiversity loss. When the agreement was signed only 17% of land territory and 10% of ocean territory were protected. The agreement includes protecting the rights of Indigenous peoples and changing the current subsidy policy to a one better for biodiversity protection. However, it makes a step backward in protecting species from extinction in comparison to the Aichi Targets. Some countries said the agreement does not go far enough to protect biodiversity, and that the process was rushed.

See also 

 2020s in environmental history
 Measurement of biodiversity
 Biodiversity offsetting
 Dark diversity
 Diversity and Distributions
 Defaunation
 Eco-costs
 Ecological extinction
 Holocene extinction
 Mass extinction
 No net loss
 Species reintroduction
 Ecological collapse

Sources

References

External links 
 Biodiversity at Our World in Data
 
 Global Biodiversity Outlook Convention on Biological Diversity

Biodiversity
Biogeography
Environmental issues
Extinction
Food security

de:Verlust von Biodiversität